Belshazzar's Feast is a story in the book of Daniel.

Belshazzar's Feast may also refer to:

Visual arts
 Belshazzar's Feast (Rembrandt), a painting by Rembrandt
 Belshazzar's Feast (Martin), a painting by John Martin
 Belshazzar's Feast, the Writing on Your Wall, an installation artwork by Susan Hiller

Music
 Belshazzar's Feast (Sibelius), incidental music by Jean Sibelius for Hjalmar Procopé's play
 Belshazzar's Feast (Walton), a 1931 choral work by William Walton
 Belshazzar's Feast (band), an English folk music duo

Other uses
The Feasts of Belshazzar, or a Night with Stalin, a 1989 Soviet historical drama film

See also
Belshazzar (disambiguation)